The Community Arts Center is a 2,078-seat performing arts center located in Williamsport, Pennsylvania, next to the Genetti Hotel. Originally a movie palace, it opened in 1928 as the Capitol Theatre. It reopened after restoration in 1993 as the Community Arts Center. The Community Arts Center has hosted entertainers such as Grand Funk Railroad, The Beach Boys, Jay Leno, Kansas, Lou Gramm, Styx, Lynyrd Skynyrd, Weird Al Yankovic, and Ted Nugent.

References

External links
 Official website

Performing arts centers in Pennsylvania